The Theory of the Undetermined Status of Taiwan, also called the Theory of the Undetermined Sovereignty of Taiwan, is one of the theories which describe the island of Taiwan's present legal status.

In 1950, after the outbreak of the Korean War, United States President Harry S. Truman said that it would be a direct threat to the United States' security in the western Pacific area if the Communist forces occupied Taiwan and that "the determination of the future status of Formosa must await the restoration of security in the Pacific, a peace settlement with Japan, or consideration by the United Nations." This statement of Truman is generally regarded as the origin of the Theory of the Undetermined Status of Taiwan.

In 1951, Japan concluded the Treaty of San Francisco with the Allied Powers. It renounced all right, title and claim to Taiwan and the Pescadores without explicitly stating the sovereignty status of the two territories.

The Theory of the Undetermined Status of Taiwan is supported by some politicians and jurists to this day.

See also 
General Order No. 1
Occupation of Japan
Treaty of San Francisco
Treaty of Taipei
Political status of Taiwan
History of Taiwan

References 

Politics of Taiwan
International relations
Cross-Strait relations
Political theories
Taiwan independence movement